Kurdish Christians are Kurds who follow Christianity. Though the majority of Kurds were Islamisized during the expansion of the Islamic caliphates in the 7th century, there still remained a number of Kurdish Christians. Modernly however, the majority of Kurdish Christians are evangelicals, and evangelical Kurdish churches have been established in Erbil, Selimani, and Duhok in the Kurdistan region of Iraq, and in Hassakeh, Qamishli, Kobani, Amouda, and Afrin (until 2018) in the Autonomous Administration of North and East Syria.

History
In the 10th century AD, the Kurdish prince Ibn ad-Dahhak, who possessed the fortress of al-Jafary, converted from Islam to Orthodox Christianity and in return the Byzantines gave him land and a fortress. In 927 AD, he and his family were executed during a raid by Thamal, the Muslim Arab governor of Tarsus.

In the late 11th and the early 12th century AD, a minority of the army of the fortress city of Shayzar was made up of Kurdish Christian soldiers.

The Zakarids–Mkhargrdzeli, an Armenian–Georgian dynasty of Kurdish origin, ruled parts of northern Armenia in the 13th century AD and tried to reinvigorate intellectual activities by founding new monasteries. At the peak of Kingdom of Georgia, the family led the unified Armeno-Georgian army. Two brothers of this family, Zakare and Ivane Mkhargrdzeli led the army to victory in Ani in 1199.

Marco Polo, in his book, stated that some of the Kurds who inhabited the mountainous part of Mosul were Christians, while others were Muslims.

Kurdish Chrisitan converts usually were a part of the Nestorian Church. In 1884, researchers of the Royal Geographical Society reported about a Kurdish tribe in Sivas which retained certain Christian observances and sometimes identified as Christian.

One of the most prominent Kurdish leaders in Iraqi Kurdistan, Sheikh Ahmed Barzani, a brother of Mustafa Barzani, announced his conversion to Christianity during his uprising against the Iraqi government in 1931.

Contemporary Kurdish Christians
Part of the English-language New Testament was first available in the Kurdish language in 1856.

The Kurdish Church of Christ (The Kurdzman Church of Christ) was established in Hewlêr (Erbil) by the end of 2000, and has branches in the Silêmanî, Duhok governorates. This is the first evangelical Kurdish church in Iraq. Its logo is formed of a yellow sun and a cross rising up behind a mountain range. According to one Kurdish convert, an estimated 500 Kurdish Muslim youths have converted to Christianity since 2006 throughout Kurdistan. A Kurdish convert from the Iraqi military who claims to have transported weapons of mass destruction also stated that a wave of Kurds converting to Christianity is taking place in northern Iraq (Iraqi Kurdistan).

There are some 80-100 Christian Kurds that converted in recent times in the city of Kobanî in the Kurdish-led Autonomous Administration of North and East Syria.

See also
 Bible translations into Kurdish
 Kurdish people
 Religion in Kurdistan

References

External links
 New Testament in Kurmanci (Latin and Cyrillic) and Sorani (Arabic script)

 
 
Christian groups in the Middle East